Penbeagle (meaning "top of the hillock") is a suburb of St Ives in Cornwall, England, UK.

There is a Cornish cross at Penbeagle, bearing an incised Latin cross.

References

Hamlets in Cornwall